Luke Fono, known professionally as Fono (born 1990), is an English record producer, electronic dance musician, and DJ from Brighton. He is best known for his 2015 single "Real Joy", which was described as one of the dance songs of the summer. "Real Joy" received support from BBC Radio 1 and BBC Radio 1Xtra DJs, including MistaJam, Danny Howard, Annie Mac, Nick Grimshaw, and Zane Lowe.

Career

2015–present: Breakthrough
Fono, released his debut single, "Real Joy", on Relentless Records on 12 June 2015. The song brought Fono to mainstream attention after receiving national airplay and when other DJs such as Duke Dumont, Calvin Harris and The Magician championed the song. Annie Mac included "Real Joy" on her sixth compilation album Annie Mac Presents 2015. The official video for "Real Joy" was premiered by The Fader on 28 April 2015 and attracted some mild controversy due to its violent content. However, the video was well received online and was subsequently nominated for "Best Dance Video -UK" in the UK Music Video Awards 2015.

In June 2015, Fono was revealed as the support act for Duke Dumont on his UK September tour.

Fono's second single, "Everybody Knows", was released in November 2015.

Discography

Singles

EPs

Other Appearances

Remixes

References

External links
 Fono on Facebook
 Fono on Twitter

British record producers
Musicians from Brighton and Hove
DJs from Brighton and Hove
1990 births
Living people